Harry Joseph Holzer (born February 25, 1957) is an American economist, educator and public policy analyst.

Early life 
Holzer grew up in a rural area near Atlantic City, New Jersey. His parents, Simon and Suzanne (née Wester), were Holocaust survivors from Poland. His father owned and operated a small chicken farm, while his mother was a seamstress and operated a fabric shop. His only sister, Marilyn, is an occupational therapist in Jerusalem.

He resides in Chevy Chase MD with his wife, Deborah, a clinical social worker and therapist. They have 3 daughters— Simone, Hannah and Leah— who are ages 28, 21 and 21 respectively.

Career 
During the Clinton Administration, Holzer served as chief economist for the United States Department of Labor.

Holzer is the John LaFarge Jr. SJ Professor of Public Policy at the McCourt School of Public Policy, Georgetown University, and an Institute Fellow at the American Institutes for Research (AIR), where he has served as co-director of the research program on post-secondary education and the labor market for the National Center for the Analysis of Longitudinal Data in Education Research (CALDER). Holzer was a founder and co-director of the Georgetown Center on Poverty, Inequality and Public Policy. He is a nonresident senior fellow with the Brookings Economic Studies Program. He is also a research affiliate of the Institute for Research on Poverty at University of Wisconsin-Madison and a national affiliate of the Stanford Center on Poverty and Inequality. He served as associate dean (2004–06) and acting dean of the Georgetown Public Policy Institute.

Holzer was a member of the editorial board at the Journal of Policy Analysis and Management, and a research fellow at the Institute for Labor Economics (IZA). He was a member of the board of directors for the Economic Mobility Corporation and served as a director for the National Skills Coalition. He was a professor of economics at Michigan State University (1983–2000), a visiting scholar at the Russell Sage Foundation and a faculty research fellow of the National Bureau of Economic Research.

Holzer holds an A.B. from Harvard University in 1978 (graduating summa cum laude and Phi Beta Kappa) and earned his Ph.D. in 1983 from Harvard University in economics.

Holzer was a signer of a 2018 amici curiae brief that expressed support for Harvard University in the Students for Fair Admissions v. President and Fellows of Harvard College lawsuit. Other signers include Alan B. Krueger, Robert M. Solow, George A. Akerlof and Janet Yellen.

Research
Holzer's research has focused on the labor market problems of low-wage workers and other disadvantaged groups, particularly minority workers. He has studied the question of how employer characteristics, hiring practices and the job quality affect job opportunities for less-skilled workers, especially when they create "mismatches" between worker skills and those sought by employers, and between their respective geographic locations (or "spatial mismatch").

Holzer studied employer data extensively and implemented surveys of about 7000 firms during the 1990s on their hiring practices, skill needs and workforce characteristics. He analyzed trends in job quality and their effects on upward mobility for low-wage workers using LEHD data on workers and firms from the U.S. Census Bureau. He analyzed data on postsecondary education and employment outcomes, especially for disadvantaged workers.

Holzer's more recent work focuses on the challenges low-income youth and adults face in American higher education and in the job market. He has written extensively about the employment problems of disadvantaged men (especially those with criminal records), advancement prospects for the working poor, and workforce development policy. He also has written about welfare reform, discrimination, affirmative action, job training programs, and the Earned Income Tax Credit.

Holzer's research on employment issues and policy has been funded by grants from the Joyce Foundation, the U.S. Department of Health and Human Services, the Rockefeller Foundation, the Russell Sage Foundation, the Institute for Research on Poverty, the Upjohn Institute, the U.S. Department of Labor, the National Science Foundation, Ford Foundation, Mott Foundation, the MacArthur Foundation, the Smith Richardson Foundation, the Gates Foundation, and the Public Policy Institute of California.

Works

Books

The Economics of Affirmative Action. (Co-edited with David Neumark.) Edward Algar, 2004

 
Reshaping the American Workforce in a Changing Economy, (coedited with Demetra Nightingale).  Washington, DC: Urban Institute Press, 2007

Articles
Harry Holzer is the author of 60 articles in peer-reviewed journals in economics and public policy, including articles in the American Economic Review, the Quarterly Journal of Economics, the Journal of Economic Literature, the Review of Economics and Statistics, the Journal of Labor Economics and the Journal of Policy Analysis and Management.

He has written dozens of book chapters and many public policy briefs for the Brookings Institution and the Urban Institute, and provided testimony to Congressional committees and other federal agencies.

Recognition
He is listed in Who’s Who in Economics (2003 edition) and in Marquis’ Who’s Who in America (beginning in 2008). Other honors include:

 The Policy Innovation Prize from the Hamilton Project at the Brookings Institution (2011)
 The Leslie Whittington Award at Georgetown University (2002)
 The Distinguished Faculty Award at Michigan State University (1998)
 The Teacher-Scholar Award at Michigan State University (1988)

References

External links
Georgetown University website: http://explore.georgetown.edu/people/hjh4/?PageTemplateID=179 
Urban Institute:  http://www.urban.org/bio/HarryHolzer.html 
IDEAS: https://ideas.repec.org/e/pho162.html 

21st-century American economists
Living people
1957 births
Harvard University alumni
University of Michigan people
Chief Economists of the United States Department of Labor
American people of Polish descent
Labor economists